Lethal is an Argentine heavy metal band, belonging to the subgenres thrash metal, speed metal. It was founded in 1987, by members of a band called Legión.

History 
The group formed in Villa Martelli in 1987. It was initially a traditional heavy metal band, but soon shifted to thrash metal. Their debut album was "Bienvenidos a mi reino" in 1990, which was recorded almost entirely in English and included the track "King of the Ring". The song was elected the best Argentine song of the year in a survey between readers of the Madhouse magazine.

In 1993, the band released a live album in Lisandro Olmos prison, the disc Radio Olmos, along with some Argentine bands, such as Hermética, Pilsen, Attaque 77, Massacre and A.N.I.M.A.L., as well as the British U.K. Subs. They also played as an opening act for Sepultura, Pantera and Anthrax

They released two hit albums, "Maza" and "Efecto Tequila". Their original guitarist, Charly Guillén, left the band in 1996 and died of HIV/AIDS on that same year. The band took a break and in 1999, released their fifth album, entitled "Lethal 5.0", which was not widely publicized, so the band announced their separation a year later.

In 2007, the band reformed and later released their sixth studio material, titled "Inyección Lethal" with a new lineup in 2010. In 2015, they released their seventh album called "Hasta la muerte".

Discography

Studio albums 
1990: Bienvenidos a mi reino
1992: Warriors
1994: Maza
1996: Efecto tequila
1999: Lethal 5.0
2010: Inyección Lethal
2015: Hasta la muerte

Live albums 
1993: Radio Olmos
2012: En vivo a través de los años (DVD)

Members

Current Lineup
 Tito García – lead vocals (1987–2000, 2007–present)
 Ramon López – guitars (2009–present)
 Eddie Walker – bass (1991–2000, 2007–present)
 Sergio Gómez – drums (2007–present)

Past Members
 Charly Guillén – guitars (1987–1995; died 1996)
 Claudio Ortiz – guitars (1987–1989, 1991–2000, 2007–2009)
 Oscar Castro – guitars (1989–1991)
 Pablo Álvarez – bass (1991–2000, 2007–present)
 Luis Sánchez  – drums (1987–1997; died 2008)
 Diego Yorio – drums (1997–2000)

Timeline

See also 
Argentine heavy metal

References 

Argentine rock music groups
Argentine heavy metal musical groups
Argentine thrash metal musical groups
Roadrunner Records artists
Musical groups from Buenos Aires
Musical groups established in 1987
Musical quartets